Environmental issues in New York State include water, waste disposal, hydraulic fracturing, air quality, and invasive species.

Water
In New York State there are a multitude of water issues. In 2016 there was a harmful algal bloom (HABs). There are a multitude of bodies of water that are being affected by this for example, Chautauqua Lake was reported with (HABs) as well as a high toxin report. In Cattaraugus County the Allegheny Reservoir* was confirmed with algal blooms but no toxins. There are many more than 50 affected by (HABs). In 1984, the "State Acid Deposition Control Act" (SADCA) required the reduction of SO2 emissions from existing sources and further NOx emission controls on new sources in New York State." Issues other causing and or helping the acid rain continue is power plants and automobiles. The environmental impact is eroding the ornamental facades, but it also messes with the sensitivity of an ecosystem like the Adirondack Mountains because the acid rains impacts the adequate soil buffering capacity to counter the acids deposited to it.

New York State's waste disposal management 
There are a multitude of different types of waste that is disposed in York State some of them being household hazardous waste (HHW), construction and demolition debris, industrial/commercial waste, regulated medical waste, waste tires, used oil, and much more. Some of the issues that York State faces is there are so many different kinds of waste that needs to be disposed of and there is not enough room for it to go.

High-volume hydraulic fracturing 
High-volume hydraulic fracturing in New York State(NYS) is no longer a problem but was earlier. Problems with this were contamination of drinking water. It polluted the air with tons of natural gas that was pumped from the ground. The drinking water at point was flammable when pedestrians and home owners would light their drinking water on fire. The smell of the gases impacted homeowners health very badly making some sick. But also it took up a lot of space and affected the living lifestyles of those that were near the sites where they pumped. Another impacted was habitat loss due to the large structures.

Air quality 
According to the American Lung Association's report State of the Air 2012, Monroe County received a grade of 'C' for ground-level ozone. That means Monroe County had four orange-alert days. That's up from the 2011 report when we had got an 'F'. Back in 2004, Rochester was ranked 43rd worst metropolitan area for air quality. (Dirty Air, Dirty Power.) And, the last time the EPA measured Monroe County for ground-level ozone in 1997, we received a 'marginal' grade, up from the previous 'non attainment' grade.

Invasive species 

In New York State there are a multitude of different invasive species including the Asian carp, the zebra mussel, emerald ash borer, purple loosestrife, the goby and more. An unfortunate byproduct of world travel and trade is the introduction of unwanted invasive species. Shipping pallets and crates, luggage, the ballast water of boats and even people can unintentionally transport invasive plants, insects and diseases to new areas. Without knowing that they would become problematic, some species have been introduced intentionally for use in landscaping, agriculture and other purposes. Invasive species impact all aspects of life, from recreation to livelihood. Spotted knapweed is an invasive plant that can take over crop fields, limiting crop production and feed for livestock. Hemlock woolly adelgid is an invasive insect that exfoliates and kills hemlock trees, a key species in maintaining important habitat along waterways.

References

Environmental issues in New York (state)